The Golden Horn Metro Bridge is a cable-stayed bridge carrying the M2 line of the Istanbul Metro across the Golden Horn in Istanbul, Turkey. It is the fourth bridge across the Golden Horn and entered service on February 15, 2014. 

The bridge enables a direct connection between Hacıosman metro station in the Sarıyer district (at the northern end of the M2 line), and the Yenikapı transport hub in the Fatih district (at the southern end of the M2 line.)

Project

The idea of the bridge was first mooted in 1952 but only really came to life during the period when Kadir Topbaş was mayor of Istanbul (2004-17). 

After the new metro line was approved by the city's Monument Protection Board and the tunnels relating to it had been completed, the Metropolitan Municipality put out a tender for construction of the bridge. By 2005, a total of 21 proposals had been submitted to the Monument Protection Board, but none was found to be sufficiently in harmony with the city's skyline. Even the successful design, by architect Hakan Kıran, was considered controversial.. 

In November 2009, the proposed height of the towers was reduced from a projected  to  after UNESCO threatened to remove Istanbul from its list of World Heritage sites. This revised design was approved in February 2012.

The bridge's conceptual design was carried out by French engineer and bridge specialist Michel Virlogeux, who also designed the Yavuz Sultan Selim Bridge (Third Bosphorus Bridge) across the Bosphorus strait. Turkish architect Hakan Kıran was responsible for the architectural design and served as the construction supervision. Wiecon Consulting Engineers & Architects carried out the structural engineering work for the bridge. It was built by a partnership between the Italian firm Astaldi and the Turkish Gülermak Ağır Sanayi İnşaat ve Taahhüt A.Ş. 

Construction began on January 2, 2009, and was initially meant to be completed within 600 days. Eventually it was finished on January 9, 2013. Test runs for the new metro began the next day, and the bridge went into service on 15 February 2014. The cost of the construction was 146.7 million.

Because of the historical character of the bridge's surroundings, the project underwent several revisions. For example, the discovery of a Byzantine-era vault on the Unkapanı/Küçükpazarı side of the bridge during excavation works for the pier foundations necessitated a redesign of the project. The design of the swing bridge operator's command building also had to be revised when the wall of a Byzantine-era basilica and a graveyard on the same bank came to light.

The eventual design pays homage to the city's maritime heritage with support towers shaped to look like horns and hull-shaped supports for the platforms.

Architecture

It is flanked by viaducts on both sides which connect the bridge with the metro tunnels on each side of the Golden Horn.

The deck is a  box girder.

On the Unkapanı/Küçükpazarı side, a  swing bridge - essentially a cantilever structure - permits passage for large ships. It has  and  spans, which rest on a central pier. Controlled from a room on a platform between the bridge and the shoreline, the swing bridge turns at a right angle about the vertical axis after lifting, and provides about  free clearance within four to six minutes. The swing bridge is intended to be open once a week between the hours of 1:00 and 5:00 in the summer time, and twice a week during these hours in the winter months. 

A station with a  platform, suitable for holding an 8-car train, is situated in the middle of the bridge. It extends across the full length of the main span, and is capped with a  canopy. The metro line over the bridge is expected to transport around one million passengers daily.

A good or bad thing for the city?

The design of the Golden Horn Metro Bridge was initially controversial. Chambers of architects and city planners, as well as many citizens, complained that the plans originally approved by UNESCO had been changed without permission. The design  was also said to damage the city's historic skyline. However, now that the Metro is open fewer complaints are heard, and the Haliç station and walkways have eased communication between the areas on either side of the bridge for non-car owners.

See also
 Galata Bridge
 Atatürk Bridge
 Haliç Bridge

References

Bridges in Istanbul
Golden Horn
Cable-stayed bridges in Turkey
2014 establishments in Turkey
Swing bridges
Bridges completed in 2014
Railway bridges in Turkey
Istanbul metro stations
Beyoğlu
Fatih